The 56th Field Artillery Regiment, Royal Canadian Artillery is a Canadian Army Reserve artillery regiment based in Brantford, Ontario. The regiment is currently part of 4th Canadian Division's 32 Canadian Brigade Group.

The 56th Field Regiment, RCA, parades at the Sgt William Merrifield Armoury, at 18 Brant Avenue, Brantford, Ontario.

Allocated Batteries
10th Field Battery, RCA (St Catharines) 
54th Field Battery, RCA (Brantford)
69th Field Battery, RCA (Simcoe)

Lineage

56th Field Artillery Regiment, RCA

Originated 28 September 1866 in York, Ontario on as the 37th "Haldimand Battalion of Rifles"
Redesignated 8 May 1900 as the 37th Regiment "Haldimand Rifles"
Redesignated 1 May 1920 as The Haldimand Rifles
Amalgamated 15 December 1936 with The Dufferin Rifles of Canada and 'C Company' of the 3rd Machine Gun Battalion, CMGC (now The Argyll and Sutherland Highlanders of Canada (Princess Louise's)) and redesignated as The Dufferin and Haldimand Rifles of Canada
Redesignated 7 November 1940 as the 2nd (Reserve) Battalion, The Dufferin and Haldimand Rifles of Canada
Redesignated 1 June 1945 as The Dufferin and Haldimand Rifles of Canada
Converted 1 April 1946 to artillery on and redesignated as the 56th Light Anti-Aircraft Regiment (Dufferin and Haldimand Rifles), RCA
Amalgamated 1 October 1954 with the 25th Medium Regiment (Norfolk Regiment), RCA', and redesignated as the 56th Field Regiment (Dufferin and Haldimand Rifles), RCA
Redesignated 12 April 1960 as the 56th Field Artillery Regiment (Dufferin and Haldimand Rifles), RCA
Redesignated 20 November 1975 as the 56th Field Artillery Regiment, RCA

The Dufferin Rifles of Canada

Originated 28 September 1866 in Brantford, Ontario as the 38th "Brant Battalion of Infantry"
Redesignated 30 November 1866 as the 38th "Brant" Battalion of Infantry
Redesignated 24 March 1871 as the 38th "Brant" Battalion of Rifles
Redesignated 3 July 1874 as the 38th "Brant" Battalion or "Dufferin Rifles"
Redesignated 28 September 1883 as the 38th Battalion "Dufferin Rifles of Canada"
Redesignated 8 May 1900 as the 38th Regiment "Dufferin Rifles of Canada"
Redesignated 1 May 1920 as The Dufferin Rifles of Canada
Amalgamated 15 December 1936 with The Haldimand Rifles and C Company of the 3rd Machine Gun Battalion, CMGC

25th Medium Regiment (Norfolk Regiment), RCA
Originated 28 September 1866 in Simcoe, Ontario, as the 39th "Norfolk Battalion of Rifles"
Redesignated 8 May 1900 as the 39th Regiment "Norfolk Rifles"
Redesignated 1 May 1920 as The Norfolk Rifles
Redesignated 15 November 1928 as The Norfolk Regiment of Canada
Converted 15 December 1936 to artillery and designated as the 25th (Norfolk) Field Brigade, RCA
Redesignated 7 November 1940 as the 25th Reserve (Norfolk) Field Brigade, RCA
Redesignated 5 September 1942 as the 25th Reserve (Norfolk) Field Regiment, RCA
Redesignated 1 April 1946 as the 25th Field Regiment (Norfolk Regiment), RCA
Redesignated 28 November 1946 as the 25th Medium Regiment (Norfolk Regiment), RCA
Amalgamated 1 October 1954 with the 56th Light Anti-Aircraft Regiment (Dufferin and Haldimand Rifles), RCA

Chart

Perpetuations

War of 1812
The Provincial Royal Artillery Drivers (The Car Brigade)
The 1st Regiment of Norfolk Militia
The 2nd Regiment of Norfolk Militia

The Great War
41st Battery, Canadian Field Artillery, CEF
4th Battalion (Central Ontario), CEF
36th Battalion, CEF
114th Battalion (Haldimand), CEF
125th Battalion (1st Overseas Battalion of 38th Regiment Dufferin Rifles), CEF
133rd Battalion (Norfolk's Own), CEF
215th Battalion (2nd Overseas Battalion of 38th Regiment Dufferin Rifles), CEF.

Operational history

The Great War
The 4th Battalion (Central Ontario), CEF, was authorized on 10 August 1914 and embarked for Britain on 3 October 1914. It disembarked in France on 12 February 1915, where it fought as part of the 1st Infantry Brigade, 1st Canadian Division in France and Flanders until the end of the war. The battalion was disbanded on 30 August 1920.

The 36th Battalion, CEF, was authorized on 7 November 1914 and embarked for Britain on 19 June 1915. The battalion provided reinforcements to the Canadian Corps in the field until 4 January 1917, when its personnel were absorbed by the 3rd Reserve Battalion, CEF. The battalion was disbanded on 15 September 1917.

The 114th Battalion (Haldimand), CEF, was authorized on 22 December 1915 and embarked for Britain on 31 October 1916. Its personnel were absorbed by the 35th Reserve Battalion, CEF and the 36th Reserve Battalion, CEF on 11 November 1916 to provide reinforcements for the Canadian Corps in the field. The battalion was disbanded on 21 May 1917.

The 125th Battalion (1st Overseas Battalion of 38th Regiment Dufferin Rifles), CEF, was authorized on 22 December 1915 and embarked for Britain on 7 August 1916. The battalion provided reinforcements to the Canadian Corps in the field until February 1917, when it was allotted to the 14th Infantry Brigade, 5th Canadian Division in England. On 16 April 1918 its personnel were absorbed by the 8th Reserve Battalion, CEF. The battalion was disbanded on 29 November 1918.

The 133rd Battalion (Norfolk's Own), CEF was authorized on 22 December 1915 and embarked for Britain on 30 October 1916, where its personnel were absorbed by the 23rd Reserve Battalion, CEF on 12 November 1916 to provide reinforcements for the Canadian Corps in the field. The battalion was disbanded on 17 July 1917.

The 215th Battalion (2nd Overseas Battalion of 38th Regiment Dufferin Rifles), CEF was authorized on 15 July 1916 and  embarked for Britain on 29 April 1917, where its personnel were absorbed by the 2nd Reserve Battalion, CEF on 18 May 1917 to provide reinforcements for the Canadian Corps in the field. The battalion was disbanded on 1 September 1917.

The 41st Battery, Canadian Field Artillery, CEF was authorized on 22 December 1915 and embarked for Britain on 18 August 1915. The battery disembarked in France on 14 July 1916, where it provided artillery support as part of the 11th Brigade, CFA, CEF in France and Flanders until 24 March 1917, when its personnel were absorbed by the 30th Battery, CFA, CEF and the 40th Battery, CFA, CEF. The battery was disbanded on 1 November 1920.

The Second World War
The Dufferin and Haldimand Rifles of Canada mobilized The Dufferin and Haldimand Rifles of Canada, CASF for active service on 24 May 1940. It was redesignated the 1st Battalion, The Dufferin and Haldimand Rifles of Canada, CASF on 7 November 1941. It served in Canada in a home defence role as part of the 17th Canadian Infantry Brigade, 7th Canadian Infantry Division. The battalion was disbanded on 8 March 1945.

Notable soldiers 

 William Merrifield 
 Oliver Milton Martin

Order of precedence

References

Field artillery regiments of Canada
Military units and formations established in 1954
Brantford
Military units and formations of Ontario